Tsolyáni is one of several languages invented by M. A. R. Barker, developed in the mid-to-late 1940s in parallel with his legendarium leading to the world of Tékumel as described in the Empire of the Petal Throne roleplaying game, published by TSR in 1975. It is detailed in The Tsolyáni Language, Part I and II.

It was the first constructed language ever published as part of a role-playing game and draws its inspiration from Urdu, Pashto, Mayan and Nahuatl. The last influence can be seen in the inclusion of the sounds hl  and tl . One exact borrowing from a real-world source is the Tsolyáni noun root sákbe, referring to the fortified highways of the Five Empires; it is the same word as the Yucatec Maya sacbe, referring to the raised paved roads constructed by the pre-Columbian Maya. Another close borrowing is from the Nahuatl word tlatoani, referring to a leader of an Aztec state (e.g. Montezuma); it is similar to the clan-name of the Tsolyáni emperors, Tlakotáni.

Alphabet
Tsolyáni is written in an offshoot of the Engsvanyáli script which was developed by Barker in parallel with the language, being very close to its modern-day form by 1950. It is read from right-to-left and is constructed like the Arabic script. The consonants each have 4 different forms: isolate, initial, medial, and final; the 6 vowels and 3 diphthongs each only have an independent initial form, while diacritical marks are used for medial and final vowels.

Each letter in the Tsolyáni Engsvanyáli script now has a name—each consonant is surrounded by a coordinating vowel:  labials in u-u, dentals in a-a, apicals in i-i, laminals in e-e, velars in o-o-, and the remaining (uvulars, glottals, ... etc.) in ü-ü:

The vowels have their names echoing in n-n, while ü (/y/ or /ɯ/) and the diphthongs echo in m-ꞌ.  These have only an isolate/initial independent letter, and are denoted by marks when falling medially or finally within a word or name:

Here are the numeral symbols the Tsolyáni use:

The punctuation signs used in Tsolyáni include:

Phonology
Tsolyáni has an unusual sound system, with elements blended from Arabic, Urdu, Pashto, and Mayan.

Diphthongs used by Tsolyáni: ai , oi , au ; those in use in related conlangs include:  ea /eɑ/, ia /ɪɑ/, eo /eɔ/.

Related conlangs
Tsolyáni was the only Tékumeláni language that had a full grammar book, dictionary, pronunciation tapes (now on CD) and a primer, all publicly released. Yet it was not the only language Barker developed for his imaginary world. He also wrote grammar guides and partial vocabularies for several other languages he developed for it: Yán Koryáni, Livyáni, Engsvanyáli and Sunúz. In the world of Tékumel, the first two are the languages of the modern nations of Yán Kór and Livyánu, respectively. Engsvanyáli is a dead language, an ancestor of Tsolyáni and many other modern Tékumeláni languages; knowledge of it is considered prestigious, and it is used in literary, liturgical, sorcerous, and scholarly contexts. Sunúz is an obscure language, used for sorcerous purposes; it contains terms to describe movement in a supposed six-dimensional multi-planar space, something of use to the fictional beings who visit the other planar realms where demons live.

Barker also wrote articles on the scripts for other languages of Tékumel.

The Yán Koryáni Block Script

CONSONANTS

VOWELS AND DIPHTHONGS

The vowels are named an, en, in, on, un, üm, ëm, öm, äm, and åm; the diphthongs have the names of aum, aim, eam, oim, iam, and eom.

The Sunúz Epilapidary Script

References

External links
 Tsolyáni entry in the Conlang Atlas of Language Structures, 2008–2010
Engsvanyáli: U+E100 – U+E14F Private Use Area mapping in the ConScript Unicode Registry

Fictional languages
Constructed languages
Constructed languages introduced in the 1940s
Tékumel